The 1958 Bulgarian Cup Final was the 18th final of the Bulgarian Cup (in this period the tournament was named Cup of the Soviet Army), and was contested between Spartak Plovdiv and Minyor Pernik on 7 November 1958 at Vasil Levski National Stadium in Sofia. Spartak won the final 1–0.

Match

Details

See also
1958 A Group

References

Bulgarian Cup finals
Bulgarian Cup Final
Bulgarian Cup Final
Cup Final